Growing Wild  is the seventh studio album by Chinese singer Li Yuchun, released in November 2016 by Yellow Stone. Instead of releasing twelve songs at one time, the album was separated into four EPs, and sold more than 6.5 million copies.

Track listing

Music videos
Sense of Presence 存在感
Open up 开放
As If 若
Fig 无花果
Ximen Youth 西门少年

Tour
Growing Wild Tour is the third concert tour by Chinese singer Li Yuchun, in support of her seventh studio album, Growing Wild (2016). The tour embarked on August 20, 2016, in Beijing and concluded on December 10, 2016, in Chongqing. The tour visited five cities of China and sold more than 50,000 tickets.

References

2016 albums
Chinese-language albums
Li Yuchun albums